James Edmund Reeves (April 5, 1829 – January 4, 1896) was a West Virginia physician and one of the leaders of the American public health movement in the nineteenth century. Reeves was the brother of Ann Reeves Jarvis, the woman who inspired the Mother's Day holiday in the United States.

Biography 

Reeves was born in Amissville, Virginia on April 5, 1829 to Josiah Washington and Nancy Kemper Reeves. His initial education was mostly self-taught, with two years of medical apprenticeship and one session of medical college at Hampden Sidney (sic) in Richmond before he entered practice in Philippi, Virginia, in 1851.

Reeves eventually received his MD degree from the University of Pennsylvania Medical College in 1860 and settled in Fairmont, Virginia, with his wife and four children. During the Civil War he did not take sides, but assisted his sister Ann with her Mothers Work Clubs. After the War he helped form a state medical society for West Virginia.

Reeves moved to Wheeling, West Virginia in 1868 where he developed an interest in public health. He was named Wheeling's first permanent health officer in 1869. He was a founding member of the American Public Health Association in 1872. In 1881 he drafted the West Virginia Board of Health Act and became the new Board's first Secretary. In 1882 he had Frank Dent arrested for practicing medicine without a license, which led to the landmark 1889 U.S. Supreme Court ruling in Dent v. West Virginia. Reeves was President of the Medical Society of West Virginia in 1882 and President of the American Public Health Association in 1885. In 1888 he moved to Chattanooga, Tennessee where he developed a career as a nationally known microscopic pathologist. He died of liver cancer on January 4, 1896.

Publications 
 A practical treatise on enteric fever: its diagnosis and treatment : being an analysis of one hundred and thirty consecutive cases, derived from private practice, and embracing a partial history of the disease in Virginia (1859)

 The physical and medical topography, including vital, manufacturing and other statistics, of the city of Wheeling (1870)

 Annual address by the president of the Medical Society of the State of West Virginia (1882)

 A hand-book of medical microscopy for students and general practitioners : including chapters on bacteriology, neoplasms, and urinary examinations (1894)

References 

 
 
 
 
 
 

1829 births
1896 deaths
Physicians from West Virginia
19th-century American physicians
Hampden–Sydney College alumni
Physicians from Virginia
People from Rappahannock County, Virginia
People from Wheeling, West Virginia
Perelman School of Medicine at the University of Pennsylvania alumni
Deaths from liver cancer
Deaths from cancer in Tennessee
American pathologists
People from Fairmont, West Virginia